Nanna Shathru (Kannada: ನನ್ನ ಶತ್ರು; English: My Enemy) is a 1992 Indian Kannada film, directed by K. S. R. Das and produced by G. R. K. Raju. The film stars Vishnuvardhan, Rekha, Srinath and Srilalitha in lead roles. The film had musical score by Rajan–Nagendra.

Cast

Vishnuvardhan
Rekha
Srinath
Srilalitha
Vajramuni
Dheerendra Gopal
Shivaram
Sihikahi Chandru
Sarigama Viji
Vijayakashi
Harikrishna
Vijay
Indudhar
Ramadevi
Manjumalini
Shyamala
M. S. Karanth
Ramamurthy
B. K. Shankar
Shani Mahadevappa

References

External links
 

1992 films
1990s Kannada-language films
Films directed by K. S. R. Das
Films scored by Rajan–Nagendra
Indian action films
1992 action films